Grigori Aleksandrovich Melikov (born 11 May 1976) is a former Russian professional footballer.

Club career
He played in the Russian Football National League for FC Mordovia Saransk in 2004.

References

1976 births
Living people
Russian footballers
Association football goalkeepers
Russian expatriate footballers
Expatriate footballers in Uzbekistan
FC KAMAZ Naberezhnye Chelny players
FC Chernomorets Novorossiysk players
FC Mordovia Saransk players
Buxoro FK players